Ostend is a quarter of Frankfurt am Main, Germany. It is part of the Ortsbezirk Innenstadt IV. The name means "East End''.

The Frankfurt Zoological Garden, the East Harbor, the former Großmarkthalle and the Frankfurt School of Finance & Management are some of the well-known institutions in the Ostend. The European Central Bank has also built their new seat close to the Großmarkthalle at the Main river. The Hoch Conservatory are also located in the Ostend.

References

Districts of Frankfurt